Salsiccia cruda (raw sausage) is a spiced pork cruda made in Northern Italy. The taste of the tartare type dish is described as soft and buttery. It is often served with toast and olive oil.

References

Italian cuisine
Pork dishes
Fresh sausages